A Sympitar is a modern form of guitar combining functional aspects of the guitar and the Indian sitar.  This instrument has a unique feature: there is a graphite channel which guides a series of "sympathetic" resonating strings through the neck from the bridge up to the headstock.  These strings vibrate or resonate against a "jiwari" bridge, which produces the sustaining drone typically associated with Indian music. The instrument(s) also have at least 6 standard guitar strings which traverse the length of the neck just as they do for a standard steel-string acoustic guitar. Depending on the notes played and on how the sympathetic strings are tuned, the sympitar's sympathetic strings will produce long waves of resonating notes, either in harmonic or enharmonic response.

The inventor of the sympitar is the master luthier Fred Carlson.

There are only a few sympitars in existence, all commissioned as custom builds. Notably, Alex de Grassi often plays a custom Carlson sympitar maple with spruce top.  Fred Carlson also spends his time in the workshop building a variation on the sympitar called the "harp sympitar", the first of which, completed in January 2002, was the Oracle Harp Sympitar commissioned by guitarist Jeffrey Titus and dedicated to the memory of Michael Hedges.

References

External links
London Guitar Academy
Website of Fred Carlson, the inventor of the Sympitar

Guitars